The Codex Maximilianeus bavaricus civilis was a civil code enacted in the Electorate of Bavaria in 1756. It was drafted entirely by the Bavarian chancellor, Wiguläus von Kreittmayr, and was named after Maximilian III Joseph. Written in German, it nonetheless included many Latin phrases. In its content, it adhered to the Usus modernus Pandectarum more strongly than later codification projects. It remained in force in Bavaria until the enactment of the German Bürgerliches Gesetzbuch (BGB) on January 1, 1900.

See also
Prussian Allgemeines Landrecht (ALR)
Napoleonic Code
Austrian Allgemeines bürgerliches Gesetzbuch (ABGB)

References

1756 in law
Civil codes
Legal history of Germany
Legal history of the Holy Roman Empire
1756 in the Holy Roman Empire
18th century in Bavaria